Joseph McGrogan (born 30 March 1955) is a Scottish former footballer, who played for Hamilton Academical and Dumbarton.

References

1955 births
Scottish footballers
Dumbarton F.C. players
Hamilton Academical F.C. players
Scottish Football League players
Living people
Association football wingers